The 7th Seiyu Awards ceremony was held on March 2, 2013 in Tokyo.

References

Seiyu Awards ceremonies
Seiyu
Seiyu
2013 in Japanese cinema
2013 in Japanese television